TTS Brighton is a patrol vessel of the Trinidad and Tobago Defence Force, based on the Damen Stan 5009 patrol vessel design.

Design

The Damen Group's design incorporates an axe bow. Her main armament is a Rheinmetall Seahawk a remotely controlled 20mm autocannon.

Operational history

In October, 2017, Brighton carried emergency relief supplies to Dominica, which had just been struck by Hurricane Maria.

References

External links

Ships of Trinidad and Tobago Coast Guard